Charles David Babb (born February 4, 1950) is a former safety for the Miami Dolphins (1972–1979). He is a graduate of Charleston High School in Charleston, Missouri.

References

1950 births
Living people
People from Charleston, Missouri
American football safeties
Memphis Tigers football players
Miami Dolphins players
People from Sikeston, Missouri